Mattia Montini (born 28 February 1992) is an Italian professional footballer who plays as a forward for  club Cerignola on loan from Monopoli.

Club career

Roma
Born in Frosinone, Lazio region, Montini started his professional career playing for the biggest club in his area Roma. After winning the reserve league with Roma in 2011, he left for Italian third division club Benevento along with Paolo Frascatore, in temporary deals.

Benevento
Montini played 9 times in 2011–12 Lega Pro Prima Divisione season and on 22 June 2012 the club excised the option to purchase half of the registration rights for €200,000, as part of the counter-option on Frascatore (€250,000). On 23 January 2013 he was signed by FeralpiSalò in temporary deal. He also extended his contract to last until 30 June 2016 on the same day. On 21 June 2013 Montini joined Benevento outright for another €63,000. The club outbid Roma in the tender process after no agreement was made.

On 5 July 2013 Montini went to loan to Cittadella of Italian Serie B with option to sign half of the registration rights. He played 4 times in the second division. On 28 January 2014 he swapped club with William Jidayi of Juve Stabia.

On 31 August 2017, he joined Livorno on loan.

Dinamo București
On 14 November 2018, Montini signed for Romanian team Dinamo București. On 15 December 2018, he scored a hattrick against Universitatea Craiova. On 4 February 2019, he scored two goals against Politehnica Iasi, bringing his tally to 6 goals in as many appearances. He was released by Dinamo in August 2020.

Monopoli
On 18 August 2022, Montini returned to Monopoli on a two-year contract. On 31 January 2023, he was loaned to Cerignola.

International career
Montini received his only Italy U20 call-up in February 2011, to replace Gianmarco Zigoni who withdrew. In the second half of the game against Germany, Montini substituted Matteo Chinellato, who himself was also a substitute in that match.

References

External links
 FIGC 
 Football.it Profile 
 

1992 births
Living people
People from Frosinone
Sportspeople from the Province of Frosinone
Footballers from Lazio
Italian footballers
Italy youth international footballers
Association football forwards
A.S. Roma players
Benevento Calcio players
FeralpiSalò players
A.S. Cittadella players
S.S. Juve Stabia players
S.S. Arezzo players
Aurora Pro Patria 1919 players
S.S.C. Bari players
S.S. Monopoli 1966 players
U.S. Livorno 1915 players
FC Dinamo București players
FC Astra Giurgiu players
Widzew Łódź players
S.S.D. Audace Cerignola players
Serie B players
Serie C players
Liga I players
I liga players
Italian expatriate footballers
Italian expatriate sportspeople in Romania
Expatriate footballers in Romania
Italian expatriate sportspeople in Poland
Expatriate footballers in Poland